This is a list of international sporting events in the Greater Manila Area in the Philippines:

Single sport events

Annual sport events

See also
 List of sports venues in the Greater Manila Area

References

Events
Sporting events
Manila
Events
Sporting events
Lists of events in the Philippines